Georges Pelletier (1939 – 16 January 2022) was a Canadian medical doctor, researcher, and academic. He was a professor at Université Laval and specialized in endocrinology. Pelletier died in Quebec City on 16 January 2022, at the age of 82.

Distinctions
Royal Society of Canada (1983)
Doctorate honoris causa from the University of Rouen Normandy (1986)
Honorary professor at the Norman Bethune University of Medical Sciences (1992)
 (1999)
Professor emeritus of Université Laval (2011)

References

1939 births
2022 deaths
French Quebecers
Canadian physicians
Canadian academics
Fellows of the Royal Society of Canada
Academic staff of Université Laval